Effort, also known as Mount Effort, is a census-designated place and unincorporated community in Chestnuthill Township, Monroe County, Pennsylvania, United States. Effort has a post office with ZIP code 18330. As of the 2010 census, its population was 2,269.

A post office called Effort has been in operation since 1850. According to tradition, the community was named for the considerable "effort" it took townspeople to agree on a name for the place.

Demographics

References

Census-designated places in Monroe County, Pennsylvania
Census-designated places in Pennsylvania
Unincorporated communities in Monroe County, Pennsylvania
Unincorporated communities in Pennsylvania